Aaj Kaa M.L.A Ram Avtar (English: Today's MLA Ram Avtar) is a 1984 political satire film starring Rajesh Khanna in the lead role. It was a remake of MLA Yedukondalu  directed by Dasari Narayana Rao in Telugu. The film fetched gross of 2 crores at the box office in 1984. The film was successful at the box office.

The newspaper Hindu in its review of the film wrote on Rajesh Khanna's performance  "Like most of his works, it is also a high-pitched melodrama which keeps you engaged with its pulsating heart and potent dialogues.In his climactic speech, Ram Avtar brings out what ails Indian democracy. When he says that those who sell their votes are equally corrupt as those who buy them, it rings a bell. When he points out that Indian public usually claps for bombastic speeches and unrealistic promises, it seems he is addressing aaj ka (today's) voter.

Synopsis
Ram Avtar works as a widowed barber in a small village and lives with his sister-in-law, Sushma, who looks after him and his kids. Ram Avtar also personally grooms Minister Digvijay Singh. When Digvijay's political party is in need of someone to stand in the forthcoming election, Digvijay recommends Ram Avtar as his choice. This chance is grabbed by Ram Avtar and he wins the elections and becomes a big politician. Sushma watches the changes in his life from the sidelines.

Cast
Rajesh Khanna as Ram Avtar
Shabana Azmi as Sushma
Shatrughan Sinha as Kranti Kumar
Asrani as Bhajanlal
Satyen Kappu as Digvijay Singh
A. K. Hangal as Balmukund Tripathi
Madan Puri as Makhanlal Kesari
Om Shivpuri as Gaurishankar
Shubha Khote as Mrs. Bhajanlal
Deven Verma as Digvijay's PA
 Huma Khan as Bhajanlal's Daughter

Soundtrack
Lyrics: Indeevar

References

External links
 

1984 films
Hindi remakes of Telugu films
1980s political drama films
Indian political drama films
1980s Hindi-language films
Films directed by Dasari Narayana Rao
Films scored by Bappi Lahiri